Coco Montoya (born Henry Montoya, October 2, 1951, Santa Monica, California) is an American blues guitarist and singer and former member of John Mayall & the Bluesbreakers.

Musical career
Montoya's career began in the mid-1970s when Albert Collins asked him to join his band as drummer. Collins took Montoya under his wing and taught him his "icy hot" guitar style. The two remained friends even after Montoya left Collins' band.

In the early 1980s John Mayall heard Montoya playing guitar in a Los Angeles bar. Soon after Mayall asked Montoya to join the newly reformed Bluesbreakers. He remained a member of the band for 10 years.

In 1995 he appeared with the Cate Brothers for the resumption of their recording career on their release, Radioland. Since that same year, Montoya has recorded several solo albums.

In 2002, he featured on the Bo Diddley tribute album Hey Bo Diddley – A Tribute!, performing the song "Pills."

His 2019 recording, Coming In Hot, was chosen as a 'Favorite Blues Album' by AllMusic.

Left-hand style
Montoya is left-handed but plays a left-handed guitar with a right-handed neck (i.e. strings upside down).

Personal life
Montoya and his longtime girlfriend Lenora married in 2009. He has two daughters; Jasmin (born 1980) and Donna (born 1988).

Discography
 1995 Gotta Mind To Travel
 1996 Ya Think I'd Know Better
 1997 Just Let Go
 2000 Suspicion
 2002 Can't Look Back
 2007 Dirty Deal
 2009 The Essential Coco Montoya (compilation)
 2010 I Want It All Back
 2014 Songs From The Road (Live)
 2017 Hard Truth
 2019 Coming In Hot

References

External links
 Official website
 [ Biography] at AllMusic

1951 births
Living people
American blues guitarists
American male guitarists
Contemporary blues musicians
American musicians of Mexican descent
Blues rock musicians
John Mayall & the Bluesbreakers members
Electric blues musicians
Musicians from Santa Monica, California
American blues singers
Guitarists from California
20th-century American guitarists
21st-century American guitarists
Hispanic and Latino American musicians